The 1994–1996 United States broadcast television realignment consisted of a series of network affiliation switches and other transactions that resulted from a multimillion-dollar deal between the Fox Broadcasting Company (commonly known as simply Fox) and New World Communications, a media group that – in addition to its involvement in film and television production – owned several VHF and UHF television stations affiliated with major broadcast networks, primarily CBS.

The agreement between Fox and New World resulted not only in Fox affiliating with stations with histories as major network affiliates but also various other deals, most notably the buyout of CBS by Westinghouse, that caused several other broadcasting companies to reach affiliation deals that either extended ties with networks that were already aligned with some stations owned by the individual groups or created new relationships between at least one of the networks and the affected partner groups.

The repercussions of this realignment were gradual but swift, with nearly 70 stations in 30 media markets throughout the United States changing affiliations between September 1994 and September 1996. Fox ascended to the status of a major television network, comparable in influence to the Big Three television networks (CBS, NBC and ABC), while CBS was dealt the major blows of losing both its partial broadcast rights to the National Football League (NFL) and key affiliates in several major markets to Fox. All three major networks also wound up affiliating with stations that broadcast on the UHF band in a few cases, the vast majority of which operated as either Fox affiliates or independent stations prior to the switches; most of the new Big Three affiliates also created news departments from scratch or expanded their existing ones.

Background
On December 17, 1993, Fox signed a four-year, $1.58 billion contract with the National Football League to televise games involving teams in the National Football Conference (NFC), effective with the 1994 season, as well as Super Bowl XXXI. CBS – then run by Laurence Tisch, known for instituting various cost-cutting measures during his tenure as chief operating officer of network parent (the original) CBS Corporation in part through the sale of underperforming units of the company – was reportedly unwilling to approach the price of Fox's bid and offered to pay only $290 million to renew the contractual rights to the NFC television package. The deal stripped CBS of professional football broadcasts for the next four years, before it resumed its broadcasting relationship with the NFL when the network acquired the television rights to the American Football Conference (AFC) from NBC in 1998.

In order to bolster the network's new NFL television package, Fox sought to reach affiliation deals with VHF stations (broadcasting on channels 2 to 13) that had established histories as major network affiliates, and carried more value with advertisers. On May 23, 1994, Fox agreed to purchase a 20% stake (a $500 million investment) in New World Communications, a media company controlled by investor Ronald Perelman that had entered into television broadcasting just over a year earlier after Perelman purchased a 51% stake in SCI Television in February 1993, and subsequently acquired stations owned by Argyle Television Holdings and Great American Communications (which would be renamed Citicasters later that year) in May 1994. As a result of the deal, New World also signed a group affiliation agreement with Fox to switch most of the company's television stations to the network beginning in September 1994. Twelve stations – six that New World had already owned and eight that the company was in the process of acquiring from Argyle and Great American/Citicasters in the deals struck the same month that the agreement was made – would join the network as affiliation contracts with their existing network partners came to an end.

SF Broadcasting, a venture between Fox and film/television production firm Savoy Pictures, purchased four television stations owned by Burnham Broadcasting in two separate deals reached in July and August 1994 for a combined $267 million; the deal resulted in Fox also signing a separate agreement to affiliate these stations (three NBC affiliates and one ABC affiliate) with the network. The New World agreement and Burnham Broadcasting purchases resulted in Fox gaining VHF affiliates in ten NFC markets – eight that were the home markets of teams in the conference, and two that were secondary markets of nearby franchises.

The deals caused major affiliation shakeups in the markets affected by the deals, as ABC, NBC and CBS immediately began seeking new affiliates, although the agreements that came about also created a domino effect in which all three longer-established networks switched affiliate partners in certain markets where neither New World nor Burnham owned stations.

Station group deals resulting from the New World agreement

Scripps/ABC affiliation deal
On June 16, 1994, ABC and Scripps-Howard Broadcasting renewed affiliation agreements with the company's two largest television stations, WEWS (channel 5) in Cleveland and WXYZ-TV (channel 7) in Detroit. In addition, Scripps agreed to affiliate three of its other stations, including two affected by the New World deal, with ABC:
 NBC affiliate WMAR-TV (channel 2) in Baltimore, replacing WJZ-TV (channel 13), which later affiliated with CBS.
 KNXV-TV (channel 15) in Phoenix, which was slated to lose Fox to CBS affiliate KSAZ-TV (channel 10) through the New World deal, replacing market-leading KTVK (channel 3).
 WFTS-TV (channel 28) in Tampa, which was also to be displaced by Fox for CBS affiliate WTVT (channel 13), replacing WTSP (channel 10).

Prior to the deal, WXYZ and WEWS were both being courted to affiliate with CBS. As a contingency plan if WXYZ-TV did reach a deal to switch to CBS, on October 3, 1994, ABC purchased its Flint, Michigan, affiliate WJRT-TV (channel 12) and NBC affiliate WTVG (channel 13) in Toledo, Ohio – whose signals covered the Detroit market – from SJL Broadcast Management, which was in the process of selling its five television stations at the time. The deal, valued at $155 million, closed on August 29, 1995. However, because its affiliation contract with that network did not expire until November 1, ABC had to run WTVG (which as WSPD-TV, was a primary ABC affiliate from 1958 to 1969) as an NBC affiliate for two months, while the latter network searched for a new affiliate; NBC ended up aligning with Toledo's former ABC affiliate, WNWO-TV (channel 24). ABC's purchase of WJRT, along with CBS' affiliation agreement with WNEM-TV (channel 5), resulted in NBC affiliating with former CBS affiliate WEYI-TV (channel 25). Separately, Scripps also signed a deal to affiliate another displaced Fox station, KSHB-TV (channel 41) in Kansas City, Missouri, with NBC, picking up the affiliation from WDAF-TV (channel 4). In September 1995, Scripps signed a separate deal to affiliate CBS station WCPO-TV (channel 9) in Cincinnati with ABC, replacing WKRC-TV (channel 12) and reversing an affiliation switch that occurred in 1961; the affiliation switch went into effect in June 1996.

Westinghouse/CBS affiliation deal

The recruitment of WMAR-TV as Baltimore's new ABC affiliate concerned Westinghouse Broadcasting (popularly known as Group W), the broadcasting division of Westinghouse and owner of WJZ-TV (channel 13), as WJZ was one of ABC's strongest affiliates (as well as its longest-tenured affiliate) in contrast to perennial third-place WMAR (which CBS left for then-NBC affiliate WBAL-TV (channel 11) in August 1981 over dissatisfaction with its frequent preemptions of CBS programs and the poor ratings performance of its newscasts). Group W had already held discussions with several networks – including CBS, NBC and Fox – for group-wide affiliation deals before the Fox-New World partnership was announced; these talks accelerated once ABC announced its agreement with WMAR.

On July 14, 1994, Group W agreed to affiliate WJZ-TV, and NBC affiliates WBZ-TV (channel 4) in Boston and KYW-TV (channel 3) in Philadelphia with CBS; while renewing the network's affiliation agreements with KDKA-TV (channel 2) in Pittsburgh and KPIX (channel 5) in San Francisco, which both began carrying the entire CBS schedule that September as a condition of the deal. WJZ-TV and WBZ-TV switched to CBS on January 2, 1995 (the switch in Baltimore was originally slated to occur on August 29, 1994; however, Group W executives elected not to exercise a six-month opt-out clause in WJZ's contract with ABC (which was set to expire on January 1), choosing to delay the transaction by five months), followed by KYW-TV on September 10; in Baltimore and Boston, NBC respectively affiliated with former CBS outlets WBAL-TV and WHDH-TV (channel 7).

KYW-TV's switch to CBS prompted an additional swap between CBS and NBC, involving KYW and WCAU-TV (channel 10) in Philadelphia – which CBS had owned since 1958 – resulting in switches in three other markets. At one point, New World had considered buying WCAU, which would have resulted in that station becoming a Fox affiliate (and therefore would have allowed it to continue airing Philadelphia Eagles games, which it had done since 1950). Additionally, in August 1993, Fox announced that it would purchase independent station WGBS-TV (channel 57) from Combined Broadcasting, which would have resulted in the network's Philadelphia affiliation being taken away from Paramount Stations Group-owned WTXF-TV (channel 29). That October, Paramount announced that WTXF would disaffiliate from Fox and become a charter affiliate of the United Paramount Network (UPN) upon that network's launch on January 16, 1995. Fox later chose to instead bid for WTXF in the event that New World did not purchase WCAU, and eventually purchased it outright; Paramount purchased WGBS (assigning it new call letters, WPSG) and made that station Philadelphia's UPN charter outlet.

In acquiring WCAU, NBC traded KCNC-TV (channel 4) in Denver – which NBC had owned since 1986 – and KUTV (channel 2) in Salt Lake City – which the network had purchased just three months before – to CBS (NBC affiliated with ABC affiliate KUSA-TV (channel 9) and CBS affiliate KSL-TV (channel 5) in the respective markets). As compensation for the trades, CBS-owned WCIX in Miami swapped transmitter facilities and channel frequencies with NBC-owned WTVJ. Westinghouse and CBS then formed a joint venture that involved KYW, KUTV, KCNC and WCIX (the latter of which had its call letters changed to WFOR-TV upon moving to the former channel 4 position of WTVJ, which in turn moved to channel 6) with Group W as the majority (51%) owner. All of the stations involved in the deal switched on September 10, 1995.

Other station group deals
 McGraw-Hill, as part of a deal that renewed agreements with the company's existing ABC affiliates WRTV (channel 6) in Indianapolis and KGTV (channel 10) in San Diego, also agreed to switch its two CBS-affiliated stations – KERO-TV (channel 23) in Bakersfield, California; and KMGH-TV (channel 7) in Denver – to ABC. KMGH-TV – which lost its CBS affiliation due to the deals spurred by NBC's purchase of WCAU – joined ABC on September 10, 1995, when KCNC became a CBS owned-and-operated station and KUSA became an NBC affiliate; KERO-TV waited until its affiliation contract with CBS expired on February 29, 1996, before becoming an ABC affiliate the following day on March 1, with CBS moving to former ABC outlet KBAK-TV (channel 29).
 Belo Corporation renewed affiliation agreements for their ABC-affiliated stations. However, in Sacramento, California, River City Broadcasting, then-owner of ABC affiliate KOVR (channel 13, now a CBS owned-and-operated station), agreed to swap networks with CBS affiliate KXTV (channel 10), then-owned by Belo; the two stations switched affiliations on March 6, 1995.
 Allbritton Communications signed a group deal with ABC, renewing agreements with its four existing affiliate stations, flagship WJLA-TV (channel 7) in Washington, D.C.; KATV (channel 7) in Little Rock, Arkansas; KTUL (channel 8) in Tulsa, Oklahoma; and WHTM (channel 27) in Harrisburg, Pennsylvania. The deal included an agreement to affiliate five other stations owned and/or operated by Allbritton with the network:
 Upstart WJXX (channel 25) in Orange Park–Jacksonville, Florida, and WB affiliate WBSG (channel 21, now WPXC-TV) in Brunswick, Georgia, both of which replaced WJKS-TV (channel 17, now CW affiliate WCWJ) as Jacksonville's ABC affiliate on February 9, 1997 (WBSG, which converted into a satellite station of WJXX on that date at the latter station's sign-on, would become a Pax TV affiliate in March 2000, shortly before Allbritton sold the station to the network's parent company Paxson Communications);
 NBC affiliate WCIV (channel 4, now Heroes & Icons affiliate WGWG; the WCIV call letters and intellectual unit now reside on channel 36 through a 2014 programming swap resulting from Sinclair's 2013 purchase of Allbritton) in Charleston, South Carolina, which switched networks with WCBD-TV (channel 2) on August 19, 1996;
 CBS affiliates WCFT-TV (channel 33, now Heroes & Icons affiliate WSES) in Tuscaloosa and WJSU-TV (channel 40, now Heroes & Icons affiliate WGWW) in Anniston, Alabama (Allbritton had acquired WCFT and the non-license assets of WJSU in September 1995, entering into a local marketing agreement with the latter's owner Osborne Communications Corporation, which subsequently sold WJSU to Flagship Broadcasting); both were converted into full-power satellites of upstart low-power station W58CK (channel 58, now WBMA-LD) in Birmingham – which Allbritton also purchased to comply with Nielsen rules for market ratings reporting as Tuscaloosa and Anniston were separate markets from Birmingham at the time – to become the ABC affiliates for central Alabama once WBRC-TV (channel 6)'s contract with the network expired on September 1, 1996.
 The Outlet Company reached a long-term affiliation agreement with NBC that renewed the network's contracts with Outlet's two existing NBC affiliates, WJAR-TV (channel 10) in Providence, Rhode Island, and WCMH-TV (channel 4) in Columbus, Ohio. As part of the deal, Outlet also agreed to switch  WNCN (channel 17) in Goldsboro, North Carolina – which the group purchased from Group H Broadcasting for $5.4 million in May 1994 – to NBC. WNCN had been a charter affiliate of The WB for nine months prior to the switch, but also carried select NBC programs that had been pre-empted by the network's existing Raleigh–Durham affiliate, WRDC (channel 28, now a MyNetworkTV affiliate), which had been one of NBC's lowest-rated affiliates throughout its tenure with the network. When WNCN joined NBC on September 3, 1995 (one month earlier than its originally announced date of October 1), WRDC affiliated with UPN, while the WB affiliation moved to upstart WRAZ (channel 50, now a Fox affiliate) when that station signed on four days later on September 7. Outlet sold its broadcasting holdings to NBC's owned-and-operated station group, NBC Television Stations, for $396 million in August 1995 (beating out an initial purchase bid by Renaissance Broadcasting), resulting in WNCN becoming that network's first owned-and-operated station on the UHF band since 1959, when it sold WNBC (channel 30) in New Britain, Connecticut, to Plains Television in June of that year (NBC would repurchase that station, by then known as WVIT, in July 1997 from the Paramount Stations Group). On February 29, 2016, through an affiliation agreement with Media General (which acquired WNCN as part of its purchase of four NBC O&Os located in mid-sized markets in 2006), WNCN switched to CBS, trading network affiliations with WRAL-TV (channel 5) as a result of a disagreement during contract renewal negotiations between WRAL owner Capitol Broadcasting Company and CBS over terms of increasing the share of retransmission revenue that the station would pay the latter (the deal reunited NBC with WRAL, which had previously served as its original Raleigh–Durham affiliate from 1956 to 1968).
Scripps-Howard Broadcasting, the same company who previously had its own deal with ABC several months earlier, reached a long-term affiliation agreement with NBC on July 25, 1994, that renewed existing contracts with two of Scripps' existing NBC affiliates KJRH-TV (channel 2) in Tulsa, Oklahoma, and WPTV-TV (channel 5) in West Palm Beach, Florida. As part of the deal, Scripps agreed to switch KSHB-TV (channel 41) in Kansas City, Missouri, which was slated to lose Fox for NBC affiliate WDAF-TV (channel 4) as part of the New World deal, with NBC, picking it up from WDAF, which was about to lose its NBC affiliation to Fox as part of its accompanying deal with New World.
River City Broadcasting reached a long-term affiliation agreement with ABC on August 26, 1994, that renewed existing contracts with two of River City's existing ABC affiliates WSYX-TV (channel 6) in Columbus, Ohio, and WLOS-TV (channel 13) in Asheville, North Carolina. As part of the deal, River City agreed to switch KDNL-TV (channel 30) in St. Louis, Missouri, its flagship station at that time, which was to be displaced by Fox for ABC affiliate KTVI (channel 2) as part of the New World deal, with ABC, picking it up from KTVI.
The aforementioned New World Communications, who were one of the culprits in the realignment with Fox, and NBC reached a long-term agreement that renewed the network's contracts with New World's existing affiliates KNSD-TV (channel 39) in San Diego, California, and WVTM-TV (channel 13), which was one of the former Times Mirror/Argyle stations that were purchased by New World in Birmingham, Alabama, while NBC and New World teamed up to produce and create the series Access Hollywood. NBC would wound up purchasing the two New World stations in 1996. But in the case of Birmingham, NBC sold its channel 13 station to Media General in 2006, which was eventually sold to Hearst Television in 2014.
Quincy Newspapers, who had to affiliate WSJV-TV (channel 28) in South Bend, Indiana, with Fox and NBC had reached a long-term affiliation agreement that renewed the network's contracts with Quincy's existing television stations WGEM-TV (channel 10) in Quincy, Illinois, KTIV (channel 4) in Sioux City, Iowa, KTTC (channel 10) in Rochester, Minnesota, and WVVA (channel 6) in Bluefield, West Virginia, while affiliating ABC affiliate WREX-TV (channel 13) in Rockford, Illinois, which Quincy acquired earlier this year with the network. ABC also signed a group deal with Young Broadcasting to affiliate with outgoing NBC affiliate WTVO (channel 17), also in Rockford, while renewing their existing affiliation agreements with WBAY-TV (channel 2) in Green Bay, Wisconsin, KLFY-TV (channel 10) in Lafayette, Louisiana, WTEN (channel 10) in Albany, New York, WKRN (channel 2) in Nashville, Tennessee, WATE-TV (channel 6) in Knoxville, Tennessee and WRIC-TV (channel 8) in Richmond, Virginia.

Impact on CBS

As expected, CBS bore the brunt of the changes. The network had developed a stodgy and overly budgeted image under Laurence Tisch, who had become CEO in 1985. Tisch was already notorious for having made deep cuts at CBS News and for selling off major portions of the company, such as the 1988 sale of Columbia Records to Sony. When CBS lost the National Football Conference rights to Fox, the "Tiffany Network"s problems accelerated as it struggled to compete in the ratings with a slate of programming that attracted an older audience than the other networks, although it finished ahead of Fox. The Late Show with David Letterman, which often dominated late-night talk competitor The Tonight Show in its first two years, saw its viewership decline in large part due to the affiliation switches, at times even finishing third in its time slot behind the ABC newsmagazine Nightline.

CBS eventually recovered and surpassed NBC – the leading broadcast network in the U.S. throughout the 1990s – as the most-watched network by 1999, until it was surpassed by ABC in 2000. After briefly retaking the lead from NBC in 2002, CBS rose to first place once again in 2005, and has been America's most watched television network for much of the period since then (except during the 2007–08 season, when Fox became the first non-Big Three network to reach first place in the Nielsen season ratings).

CBS' problems were especially evident in the recruiting of new affiliates; as a direct result of the New World-Fox alliance, only six of the new CBS affiliates were VHF stations:
 In Dallas–Fort Worth, Gaylord Broadcasting-owned independent station KTVT (channel 11) replaced KDFW-TV (channel 4) as the market's CBS affiliate on July 1, 1995 (a move that resulted in KTVT – which, prior to affiliating with the network, was available on cable providers throughout the South Central United States – abdicating its regional superstation status); CBS eventually purchased KTVT from Gaylord in April 1999. KDAF (channel 33, now a CW affiliate), an original Fox-owned station, was sold to Renaissance Broadcasting and became an affiliate of The WB, which originally affiliated with Christian Broadcasting Network-owned independent KXTX-TV (channel 39, now a Telemundo owned-and-operated station) when that network launched on January 11, 1995.
 As a byproduct of the KTVT deal, Seattle–Tacoma sister station KSTW (channel 11) affiliated with CBS on March 13, 1995 (as with KTVT, KSTW – which was distributed on cable providers in much of Washington, northern Idaho and much of British Columbia – lost its regional superstation status as a result). KIRO-TV (channel 7), which affiliated with UPN at that time, rejoined CBS on June 30, 1997, following Belo Corporation's sale of KIRO to Cox Enterprises (incidentally, in 1997, Fox planned a trade of KSAZ-TV in Phoenix and KTBC (channel 7) in Austin to Belo in exchange for KIRO-TV, which never materialized). Through its 2000 merger with Viacom, CBS has since acquired KSTW, which is now a CW owned-and-operated station.
 As a condition of renewing its affiliation with KCTV (channel 5) in Kansas City, CBS persuaded the Meredith Corporation to affiliate independent station KPHO-TV (channel 5) in Phoenix (which was that market's original CBS affiliate from 1949 to 1953) and NBC affiliate WNEM-TV in Bay City, Michigan, with the network. KPHO replaced KSAZ-TV as Phoenix's CBS affiliate on September 12, 1994 (KSAZ operated as an independent station for three months until the affiliation contracts of ABC affiliate KTVK and Fox affiliate KNXV-TV expired on December 11, when KSAZ joined Fox and KNXV formally affiliated with ABC, after a two-month transitional period in which it carried select ABC programs dropped by KTVK); WNEM became the network's affiliate for the Flint–Bay City–Saginaw market on January 16, 1995, at which time it also added secondary affiliations with UPN and The WB (with both networks' programming airing in late-night on tape delay).
 The two Citicasters stations displaced in the ABC-Scripps alliance, WTSP in Tampa-St. Petersburg (which switched to CBS on December 12, 1994) and WKRC-TV in Cincinnati (which waited until WCPO-TV's contract with CBS ended on June 1, 1996, to switch), also affiliated with CBS.

Because of the New World and Scripps deals, and other stations' unwillingness to switch to the then-struggling network, CBS found itself in extremely undesirable situations in three major markets, where it ended up on low-profile UHF stations with far less transmitting power and viewer recognition than their previous affiliates:
 In Atlanta, CBS affiliated with independent station WGNX (channel 46, now WANF), which was originally slated to become a charter affiliate of The WB (by way of the partial ownership interest in the network held by then-owner Tribune Broadcasting, which agreed to affiliate WGNO (channel 26) in New Orleans – which did affiliate with The WB at the network's January 1995 launch – with ABC to replace WVUE-TV (channel 8), which joined Fox on January 1, 1996, through the SF Broadcasting agreement); WGNX replaced WAGA-TV (channel 5) as the market's CBS outlet when that station joined Fox on December 11, 1994. Shortly beforehand, CBS almost purchased independent station WVEU (now CW owned-and-operated station WUPA), which broadcast on channel 69, the highest available channel in the U.S. during the later era of analog television; it would later buy that station in 2000 as a UPN affiliate. The market's former Fox O&O, WATL (channel 36, now a MyNetworkTV affiliate), was sold to Qwest Broadcasting and became a WB affiliate.
 In Milwaukee, CBS faced difficulty in finding an affiliate to replace WITI-TV (channel 6), and considered importing the signals of O&Os WBBM-TV (channel 2) in Chicago or WFRV-TV (channel 5, now an affiliate of the network) in Green Bay, or its Madison, Wisconsin, affiliate WISC-TV (channel 3) via cable. One week before WITI was scheduled to switch to Fox, after an attempt to buy religious station WVCY-TV (channel 30) fell through, CBS struck an affiliation deal with WDJT-TV (channel 58), a general entertainment independent station with some ethnic and time-brokered religious programming, which switched to the network on December 11, 1994. Its owner, Weigel Broadcasting, had its roots in running Chicago independent WCIU-TV (channel 26) – which, on December 31, 1994, lost its part-time Univision affiliation and converted into a full-time English language independent station in an unrelated deal to fellow English independent WGBO-TV (channel 66), which Univision purchased from Combined Broadcasting in January of that year after Weigel management refused its stipulation that WCIU drop its part-time English programming and become a full-time affiliate of the Spanish language network – and at the time never had any of its stations affiliated with a major network. Former Fox affiliate WCGV-TV (channel 24, now a MyNetworkTV affiliate) joined UPN when that network launched one month later. As WDJT lacked cable carriage in the market, several of CBS' remaining sports properties, most notably the Daytona 500, could not be viewed on some southeastern Wisconsin cable systems during 1995 until the station could sign new carriage contracts. In January 1996, WDJT moved its operations from the Marc Plaza Hotel to a larger studio space in one of the former buildings of the Allis-Chalmers complex in West Allis and started a news department. WDJT built a new transmitter in 1999, which has transmitting power equal with the five other commercial stations in the market.
 In Detroit, finding an affiliate to replace WJBK-TV (channel 2) proved especially difficult for CBS, particularly after WXYZ-TV was eliminated as an option when Scripps renewed its agreement with ABC. NBC affiliate WDIV (channel 4) and independent station WXON (channel 20, now WMYD) displayed disinterest in entering into negotiations with CBS, while the network was unable to strike an affiliation deal with soon-to-be former Fox affiliate WKBD-TV (channel 50), as then-owner Paramount Stations Group had committed it to become a UPN charter affiliate. Like in Milwaukee, CBS was faced with the prospect of having to convince area cable providers to import affiliates from nearby markets (WNEM-TV, whose involvement in the Meredith deal with CBS was mainly to provide a default affiliate, as its signal reached most of Detroit's northern suburbs; WLNS-TV (channel 6) in Lansing, which built a translator in Ann Arbor; and WTOL-TV (channel 11) in Toledo) to relay its programming in the event that it could not land an affiliate within Detroit itself. CBS had earlier broken off negotiations to affiliate with WADL (channel 38), when that station's owner, Kevin Adell, began making unreasonable demands. In an eleventh-hour deal reached one month before WJBK was set to switch to Fox on December 11, 1994, CBS purchased WGPR-TV (channel 62) from an African-American group of Masons for $24 million, subsequently changing its calls to WWJ-TV. The purchase of WGPR (notable for being the first U.S. television station to have been owned by African-Americans) by a major network instead of a minority-owned broadcaster was controversial, leading Spectrum Detroit Inc., an investment group led by Lansing-based real estate investor and broadcaster Joel Ferguson, to sue to block the purchase and gain control of the station; however, a court ruled in 1995 to allow the sale to CBS to go forward. WGPR previously had the weakest signal of any UHF station in Detroit, but CBS invested heavily in the station and significantly upgraded its facilities; however, its viewership suffered as a result of WWJ-TV's lower profile in Detroit as a whole and its limited cable carriage in the outer portions of the market for more than a year after it joined CBS. The former Fox affiliate, WKBD (now a CW owned-and-operated station and co-owned with WWJ-TV), joined UPN.

While the former CBS affiliates in the three markets were all considered to be ratings contenders, ratings for CBS programming in these markets dropped significantly after the network moved to the lower-profile UHF stations, which had virtually no significant history as a former major network affiliate or as a first-tier independent station.

CBS also affiliated with UHF stations in two other markets affected by the New World deal, WOIO (channel 19) in Cleveland and KEYE-TV (channel 42) in Austin, through individual agreements with Malrite Communications Group and Granite Broadcasting that were respectively signed in July and October 1994. However, unlike in Atlanta, Milwaukee and Detroit, KEYE and WOIO both had network affiliations prior to switching to CBS, as both stations – which respectively lost their affiliations with that network to KTBC-TV and WJW-TV (channel 8) – had been affiliated with Fox since it launched in October 1986. CBS had to affiliate with a UHF station by default in both cases; in Cleveland, WEWS renewed its contract with ABC through the network's agreement with Scripps, while NBC had owned a 49% interest in WKYC-TV (channel 3) at the time (with Multimedia Inc. holding the remaining controlling interest); in Austin, the vast majority of the television stations in that market (with KTBC as the only major exception) broadcast on the UHF band.

Other effects
 The Westinghouse deal involving WBZ-TV resulted in CBS selling WPRI-TV (channel 12) in Providence, Rhode Island, to Clear Channel Communications for $68 million on April 14, 1996. CBS had acquired WPRI from Narragansett Television L.P. eleven months earlier in March 1995 for $80 million, a purchase that was the catalyst of another affiliation switch, as the ABC affiliation in Providence moved from WPRI to CBS affiliate WLNE (channel 6) on September 10, 1995, reversing an affiliation swap between the two stations that occurred in June 1977 (which itself resulted from a group affiliation deal between ABC and WPRI's owner at that time, Knight Ridder Broadcasting). The sale of WPRI resulted from rules enforced at the time by the Federal Communications Commission (FCC) that prohibited common ownership of stations in adjacent markets with overlapping signals, with no consideration for a waiver for stations with large overlapping coverage areas (WPRI's signal carried over into most of the Boston market, whereas WBZ-TV's signal covered almost all of Rhode Island).
 In Monroe, Louisiana, ABC affiliate KARD (channel 14) switched to Fox on April 17, 1994; however, because the Monroe–El Dorado market was served by only three commercial television stations at the time, this prevented ABC from being able to find a station to become a full-time affiliate and the network did not elect for a secondary affiliation with either CBS affiliate KNOE-TV (channel 8) or NBC affiliate KTVE (channel 10). Thereafter, ABC programming could only be received in the Monroe-El Dorado market either via cable through both Little Rock affiliate KATV, Shreveport affiliate KTBS-TV (channel 3) or Alexandria affiliate KLAX-TV (channel 31), or via satellite providers Dish Network and PrimeStar through both New York O&O WABC (channel 7) and Los Angeles O&O KABC (channel 7) via their "national superstation" packages; the network would regain an over-the-air affiliate when KAQY (channel 11, now MeTV affiliate KMLU) signed on in December 1998. (KAQY's former intellectual unit, including the ABC affiliation, was moved to the second digital subchannel of KNOE-TV in September 2014.)
 In Evansville, Indiana, longtime ABC affiliate WTVW (channel 7, now a CW affiliate) switched to Fox on December 3, 1995, through a deal with then-owner Petracom Communications (a company in which Fox had acquired a 20% interest shortly after Petracom purchased WTVW earlier that year). At that time, ABC programming moved to WEHT (channel 25); the CBS affiliation displaced by WEHT moved to the market's original Fox affiliate WEVV-TV (channel 44). Fox disaffiliated from WTVW on July 1, 2011, due to a dispute with then-owner Nexstar Broadcasting Group (which subsequently traded WTVW to partner company Mission Broadcasting in order to acquire WEHT) after the company objected to a plan by the network to increase the share of retransmission revenue its affiliates paid to the network. The Fox affiliation then moved to WEVV's digital subchannel (which was already affiliated with MyNetworkTV), while WTVW became an independent station.
 In Binghamton, New York, NBC affiliate WICZ (channel 40) became a Fox affiliate on April 4, 1996, after its contract with the former network expired. The agreement, which was signed in November 1995, expanded upon an existing arrangement with Fox that began seven months earlier in September 1995, when WICZ added a secondary affiliation with the network for the purpose of carrying its children's programming block, Fox Kids (resulting in the station pre-empting NBC's daytime and Saturday morning programming, particularly the network's soap opera lineup). Prior to the switch (and effectively, before even the addition of Fox Kids on WICZ), Fox's entertainment and sports programming was only available in the Binghamton market on area cable providers via either the network's national feed, Foxnet, or through its stations in nearby markets, such as New York City owned-and-operated station WNYW (channel 5). On the date of the switch, WETM (channel 18) in Elmira launched a cable-only feed of the station with separate advertising targeted at Binghamton to replace WICZ as the market's NBC affiliate; Smith Broadcasting, then-owner of WETM, later purchased low-power station WBGH-CA (channel 20) to operate as a part-time repeater of its Elmira sister station in 1997.
 In Terre Haute, Indiana, ABC affiliate WBAK-TV (channel 38) switched to Fox on January 31, 1995. Due to a lack of available stations in the market for ABC to maintain a full-time affiliation (NBC affiliate WTWO (channel 2) and CBS affiliate WTHI-TV (channel 10) are the only other commercial full-power stations in Terre Haute), this left viewers with only fringe access to out-of-market ABC stations, including WEHT, WRTV in Indianapolis and WAND (channel 17) in Decatur, Illinois (the latter market's ABC affiliation moved to former NBC affiliate WICS (channel 20) and its Champaign–Decatur semi-satellite WICD (channel 15) in 2005). Due to the same dispute that led WTVW to lose its Fox affiliation in 2011, what had become WFXW rejoined ABC and changed its call letters to WAWV-TV, while Fox moved to a subchannel of WTHI.
 In San Diego, UPN affiliate KUSI-TV (channel 51, now an independent station) tried unsuccessfully to take the Fox affiliation away from Tijuana, Baja California, Mexico-licensed XETV (channel 6), citing FCC regulations preventing any foreign station outside of the United States from airing live American sporting events without an FCC-approved license; Fox was eventually granted the permit to allow XETV to carry the games.
In San Antonio, Fox had to affiliate with independent station KABB-TV (channel 29), which was slated to be a UPN affiliate as part of a group deal with River City Broadcasting, while UPN aligned with KRRT (channel 35), which was once owned by Paramount Stations Group, a successor of TVX Broadcast Group, which is about to sell its station to Jet Broadcasting, which entered a LMA with KABB.
 In Honolulu, Hawaii, where its longtime affiliate KHON-TV (channel 2) joined Fox through the affiliation deal tied to SF Broadcasting's purchase of the Burnham stations, NBC courted ABC affiliate KITV (channel 4) for an affiliation. However, after KITV was sold to Argyle Television Holdings II and opted to remain affiliated with ABC instead, NBC instead chose to affiliate with former Fox affiliate KHNL (channel 13). KHNL officially became the market's NBC affiliate on January 1, 1996.
 In South Bend, Indiana, where full-power affiliate WSJV (channel 28, now a Heroes & Icons affiliate) switched to Fox on October 18, 1995, ABC affiliated with Weigel-owned W58BT (channel 58, now on channel 57), a low-power translator of WCIU-TV which also carried Fox programming, almost by default due to the lack of another available commercial full-power station in the market (WNDU-TV (channel 16) and WSBT-TV (channel 22) were respectively under ongoing contracts with NBC and CBS, while the only other choice, WHME-TV (channel 46), was owned by religious organization Lester Sumrall Evangelistic Association and had no intent to sell or take on a network affiliation). This caused the same cable entanglements and reception problems that occurred in Milwaukee, particularly as W58BT's existing transmitter suffered a partial failure on the morning of the switch that would not be fixed for a few days (ABC representatives insisted that W58BT affiliate with the network on the same date that WSJV joined Fox, even though a new transmitter that would expand its coverage area to a 40-mile radius of South Bend was two months away from completion), though the market had fringe access to several other ABC stations, including its Chicago O&O WLS-TV (channel 7) and Battle Creek, Michigan, affiliate WOTV (channel 41). W58BT eventually became a licensed low-power outlet under the calls WBND-LP; it did not start a limited news operation until 2008, and launched a full locally based news department in April 2011. The switch had the benefit of allowing viewers in South Bend to better receive Fox's broadcasts of Chicago Bears games, a team for which South Bend has long served as a secondary market (prior to that deal, WSBT had signed an agreement with Fox in March 1994 to air the network's NFL telecasts). Because of its weakness in the market, Weigel tried to sell WBND, along with sister CW and MyNetworkTV low-power stations WCWW-LP (channel 51) and WMYS-LP (channel 69), to Schurz Communications, the founding owners of WSBT-TV, in 2008. However, FCC inaction and concerns about Schurz having a virtual television monopoly in South Bend led to the deal being aborted in August 2009 (the sale would have been legal, as the FCC permits common ownership of low-power and full-power television stations in the same market). (The Fox affiliation in South Bend moved to a subchannel of WSBT in August 2016, per an agreement between WSJV owner Quincy Media and WSBT owner Sinclair Broadcast Group in exchange for the ABC and CW affiliations in Peoria, Illinois from Sinclair-owned WHOI.)
 In Ada, Oklahoma, KTEN (channel 10) joined Fox as an additional primary affiliation in July 1994, in addition to its existing primary affiliation with NBC (under which, it carried the majority of NBC's schedule) and a secondary affiliation with ABC (consisting only of select prime time, daytime and children's programs). KTEN scheduled Fox's prime time lineup in a hodgepodge manner, airing a few of the network's shows in their designated evening slots while the remainder were aired in late-night; it also cleared select Fox Sports programs and the Fox Kids children's program block. After KTEN became an exclusive NBC affiliate in September 1998, viewers in the Ada–Sherman–Denison market could only access Fox and ABC programming via cable respectively through either KDFW and WFAA (channel 8) in Dallas or KOKH-TV (channel 25) and KOCO-TV (channel 5) in Oklahoma City, due to the lack of available commercial stations for either network to maintain an exclusive affiliation (KTEN and CBS affiliate KXII (channel 12) are the only commercial full-power stations in the market, while low-powered KOKT-LP (channel 20, now defunct) opted to affiliate with UPN upon that station's 1995 launch); KXII would launch a Fox-affiliated secondary subchannel in September 2006, while KTEN launched a tertiary subchannel affiliated with ABC in May 2010.
 In Rapid City, South Dakota, full-power NBC affiliate KEVN-TV (channel 7) and its satellite KIVV-TV (channel 5) in Lead became a Fox affiliate on July 1, 1996, as a byproduct of Heritage Media's sale of the two stations to Blackstar, LLC, a minority-controlled company which had non-voting equity interests held by Fox Television Stations and Silver King Communications; NBC moved its affiliation to low-power station KNBN-LP (channel 24). Prior to the switch, ABC affiliate KOTA-TV (channel 3, now MeTV affiliate KHME) maintained a secondary affiliation with Fox beginning in September 1994, mainly to carry its NFL game telecasts; the remainder of the network's entertainment programming could only be received in the market via cable through Foxnet or its then-owned-and-operated station KDVR (channel 31) in Denver. Conversely, due to a lack of available full-power stations in the market for NBC to maintain a full-time affiliation (KOTA-TV and KCLO-TV (channel 15, a satellite of Sioux Falls CBS affiliate KELO-TV) were the only other commercial full-power stations in the Rapid City market at the time), viewers were only able to access KNBN-LP over-the-air in Rapid City proper and adjacent rural areas. Viewers living outside of Rapid City or those who could not receive the KNBN-LP signal could only access out-of-market full-power NBC stations via local cable providers, including KUSA-TV (since KNBN-LP was not available on cable in the market). The market would regain a local full-power NBC affiliate when KNBN-TV (channel 21) signed on in May 2000, after which KNBN-LP became a repeater of that station and later changed its callsign to KKRA-LP. (The KEVN call letters, virtual channel and intellectual unit, including the Fox affiliation, moved to a low-power station and the KOTA call letters, virtual channel and intellectual unit, including the ABC affiliation, moved to the former KEVN full-power signal in February 2016, through a programming swap resulting from Schurz Communications' 2015 acquisition by Gray Television.)
 In Macon, Georgia, ABC affiliate WGXA-TV (channel 24) – which had been sold to GOCOM Media months before – switched to Fox on January 1, 1996, trading affiliations with WPGA-TV (channel 58), which had affiliated with Fox only ten months earlier in February 1994. WPGA disaffiliated from ABC on January 1, 2010, citing conflicts with the risqué content of some of the network's programming (specifically involving homosexuality) and the station's "family-friendly" programming focus, and objections to the network demands that WPGA owner Register Communications increase the share of retransmission consent revenue it pays to ABC to in order to remain an affiliate. The ABC affiliation reverted to WGXA, which began carrying the network on its second digital subchannel. The decision by Register management to convert WPGA into an independent station led to legal entanglements between Register and cable provider Cox Communications, which intended to place WGXA-DT2 on the channel slots held by WPGA, a case that was eventually settled by a December 2011 ruling by the FCC that WPGA had elected for retransmission consent (Register Communications president Lowell Register stated it had elected must-carry carriage, but representatives neglected to file to retain that status) in its original carriage contract with Cox, requiring it to negotiate an agreement to be carried on the provider.
 In Yuma, Arizona–El Centro, California, KECY-TV (channel 9) switched from CBS to Fox in September 1994, as a result of an agreement signed between the network and KECY's then-owner Pacific Media Corporation that was spurred in part by disagreements between CBS and Pacific Media over several issues; KECY would also add a secondary affiliation with UPN when that network launched in January 1995, carrying its programming in late-night after Fox prime time programming. Because the Yuma–El Centro market had only three full-power commercial stations (KYMA-DT (channel 11) and KSWT (channel 13) were the only others at the time), KSWT's decision to rejoin CBS (which had previously been affiliated with that station from 1970 to 1991, at which time it moved its programming to KYMA) resulted in viewers in the Yuma–El Centro market having to rely on cable to receive ABC programming (through either KNXV-TV in Phoenix on the Arizona side of the market or KGTV in San Diego on the California side). KECY would rejoin ABC in January 2007, when it launched a second digital subchannel affiliated with the network (conversely before KECY joined Fox, that network's programming was only available via cable through either XETV-TV in Tijuana–San Diego on the California side of the market or KNXV-TV on the Arizona side or via Foxnet on cable).
 The Pacific Media deal resulted in a concurring switch in Palm Springs, California, involving K40DB (channel 40, now KDFX-CD on channel 33; the channel 40 allocation was later occupied by Univision affiliate KVER-CA), an Indio-based low-power translator of KECY that was a major catalyst for the company's agreement with Fox as CBS had opposed a proposal by Pacific Media to convert K40DB into a full-power station (effectively resulting in an upgrade of the station's signal to reach the entire market). Although Fox supported the idea, the conversion plan never materialized, and the station continues to operate as a low-power outlet. The Palm Springs market has only two full-power commercial stations (NBC affiliate KMIR-TV (channel 36) and ABC affiliate KESQ-TV (channel 42)); however, rather than settling for an affiliation with one of the area's low-power outlets, CBS opted to relay its programming to the Coachella Valley via cable through Los Angeles owned-and-operated station KCBS-TV (channel 2) or KFMB-TV (channel 8) in San Diego. The network would not have an over-the-air affiliate in Palm Springs until Desert Television signed on KPSP-LP (channel 38) in September 2002. Lambert Broadcasting converted K40DB into a separate outlet from KECY after it acquired the station in 1997.
 In Wilmington, North Carolina, Pacific Media's agreement with Fox caused another affiliation switch involving one of its CBS affiliates, WJKA (channel 26, now WSFX-TV), in September 1994. Prior to WJKA affiliating with the network, Wilmington was the only North Carolina market that did not have an over-the-air Fox affiliate (with area cable providers having to carry WLFL (channel 22, now a CW affiliate) in Raleigh by default), although the switch had the side effect of causing CBS to no longer be available over-the-air in the market until March 2000, when low-power UPN affiliate WILM-LP (channel 10, now an independent station) switched to the network (in the interim, cable providers carried either WRAL-TV in Raleigh, WNCT-TV (channel 9) in Greenville or WBTW (channel 13) in Myrtle Beach, South Carolina, as default CBS affiliates). The switch resulted in WSFX becoming the default Fox affiliate for the southern portion of the Florence–Myrtle Beach market until WGSE-TV (channel 43, now WFXB) affiliated with the network in 1996 (beforehand, cable providers in the Florence area either received WGSE or WFXI (channel 8) in Morehead City as default Fox affiliates, since the broadcast signal of WFXI did not reach the Pee Dee region).
 In some smaller markets where Fox did not have an affiliate, the network had to strike deals with Big Three-affiliated stations (ABC and CBS from 1994–97, ABC and NBC from 1998) to carry its football telecasts. In Wausau, Wisconsin, ABC affiliate WAOW-TV (channel 9) aired Fox's NFL broadcasts until Wittenberg-licensed Fox affiliate WFXS (channel 55, now defunct; channel now occupied by WZAW-LD, which assumed the intellectual assets of WFXS, including the Fox affiliation, in July 2015) signed on in 1999 (as a result, WAOW carried up to thirteen Green Bay Packers games per year from 1994 to 1998 through both Fox and ABC). In Cedar Rapids, Iowa, CBS affiliate KGAN-TV (channel 2) carried the NFL on Fox package, as a result of Fox affiliate KOCR-TV (channel 28, now KFXA) ceasing operations temporarily in 1994 due to its failure to make electricity payments and the station's eviction from its facilities. ABC affiliate WYTV (channel 33) in Youngstown, Ohio, took on Fox as a secondary affiliation strictly for the NFL package, due to the ownership of the San Francisco 49ers being locally based, as well as to be able to air Pittsburgh Steelers and Cleveland Browns home games against NFC teams (the latter reasoning would temporarily become moot due to the Browns' temporary deactivation from 1995 to 1998), until CBS affiliate WKBN-TV (channel 27) launched WYFX-LP (at the time channel 62, now channel 19) as a full-time Fox affiliate in 1998 (WYTV is now operated by WKBN though a shared services agreement).

Programming repercussions
Because Fox programmed far fewer hours of network content than CBS, NBC and ABC, the affiliation transactions in which the former aligned with stations previously affiliated with one of the latter three established networks resulted in time slots being opened up on the new Fox affiliates for those stations to fill via syndication. Despite this, several popular first-run syndicated programs at the time (such as The Oprah Winfrey Show, Wheel of Fortune, Jeopardy! and Entertainment Tonight) were dropped by many of the New World stations – with a few exceptions – which replaced them with lower-budget syndicated programs or newer series (such as Access Hollywood and Judge Judy, the latter of which has since become a staple of many Fox stations). In several of the affected markets, the stations that switched to Fox kept or later acquired some of the aforementioned programs (for example, WVUE and WLUK now air both Wheel of Fortune and Jeopardy!; while KHON continued to carry Oprah until it ended in May 2011 and continues to carry Wheel).

The new Big Three outlets that were previously affiliated with Fox or operated as independent stations also dropped some first-run and off-network syndicated programs – mainly sitcoms and children's programs – due to local programming commitments and the heavier amount of programming being provided by their new network. The divested programs were acquired by other stations in the affected markets, primarily independents or charter affiliates of UPN and The WB. While these stations largely removed animated and some live-action syndicated children's programs from their schedules, some of the new Big Three stations continued to maintain a reduced syndication inventory that closely mirrored those typical of independent or Fox stations (at the time, CBS, NBC and ABC stations had begun refocusing their programming schedules outside of locally produced and network content around first-run syndicated shows, with a decreased emphasis on first-run and off-network scripted programs – dropping or scaling back sitcoms and relegating drama series to weekend early access and late-night time periods). A few of these newfound major network affiliates that retained certain off-network scripted series that they carried before joining their new networks (such as KSHB-TV, WGNO and WDJT-TV) chose to use those programs to fill select time slots traditionally occupied by local newscasts, until they were either able to start news departments or expanded their news programming output.

Stations that were impacted by the switches began turning down weaker programs aired by their departing network. In Phoenix, KTVK turned down an offer to affiliate with CBS in anticipation of renewing its affiliation agreement with ABC. However, after KNXV was awarded the ABC affiliation through the Scripps deal, KTVK began pre-empting most of the network's programming. On its final day as a lame-duck ABC affiliate (January 8, 1995), KTVK only had ABC's prime time lineup, major soap operas and sports programming remaining on its schedule, with KNXV picking up the pre-empted ABC programs. In Atlanta, WAGA began turning down some weaker CBS programs on a week-by-week basis before it switched to Fox on December 11, 1994, with those programs being aired in the interim by independent station WVEU.

Local newscasts
In 1994, Fox (which only had a few affiliates that carried local newscasts at the time) began demanding that its affiliates launch newscasts in the run-up to the launches of Fox News Channel, and their connecting affiliate news sharing service, Fox NewsEdge in late 1996 (prior to and after NewsEdge's launch in August of that year, the new Fox stations as well as its news-producing charter outlets relied solely on external video feeds from CNN Newsource and in some cases, Associated Press Television News and/or the Reuters News Service to cover national and international news stories). The primary plus for the new Fox stations collectively was an increase in the amount of local news programming (in contrast with the syndication-dominant format of most Fox stations at the time), which Fox had a strong interest in its stations maintaining as the network did not have national newscasts – the lone exception later being Fox News Sunday, a political talk show that debuted in April 1996.

The new Fox affiliates retained most of their existing newscasts (though WVUE-TV, WALA-TV (channel 10) in Mobile and WLUK-TV (channel 11) in Green Bay would later drop those in the midday and, as with KSAZ and KTBC, 6:00 p.m. timeslots), but expanded their morning newscasts by one or, most commonly, two hours and early evening newscasts by a half-hour to replace news programs aired by their former network (though WAGA, WJBK, WITI, WJW and WTVT had dropped CBS This Morning in 1992–93 in favor of their own morning newscasts; WVUE, however, did not launch a morning newscast until September 2002); exceptions to such expansions were WICZ and WSJV, which cancelled their early evening newscasts upon joining Fox, limiting news programming to prime time and (in the case of WSJV) morning newscasts. WDAF, KHON, WJBK and KTBC replaced evening network newscasts with local programs with a similar focus on national and international news; KHON's Hawaii's World Report, which replaced NBC Nightly News after its January 1996 switch to Fox, is the only such program that remains . The new Fox stations also added newscasts in the final hour of prime time (9:00 or 10:00 p.m., depending on the time zone), which either supplanted (such as on WJBK, WJW and WAGA) or were paired with (such as on KDFW, WDAF and WITI) existing late newscasts in the traditional 11:00/10:00 p.m. time slot – however upon joining Fox, KTVI (channel 2) in St. Louis, KTBC and KHON aired syndicated programs in the hour following Fox's prime time lineup instead, and would not add their own primetime newscasts until September 1997, August 2000 and September 2014 respectively.

Over time, Fox affiliates that did not have existing news operations have debuted their own local newscasts, usually starting with a prime time newscast, with broadcasts in other time periods being added gradually (Fox stations in some medium and most small markets, however, have had their newscasts produced by a local Big Three affiliate through news share agreements, an arrangement that typically limits them from maintaining a news-intensive schedule akin to the Big Three stations that joined Fox through the New World and SF Broadcasting deals, with some of them later terminating these partnerships to start producing their own newscasts); many Fox charter stations (including those owned and operated by the network), as well as the former Big Three stations which had aired newscasts for years, would gradually expand their news programming. Before the New World deal was announced, Fox was in the process of launching prime time newscasts on its owned-and-operated stations in Atlanta (WATL) and Dallas (KDAF), and had even hired a news director at WATL; these plans were shelved as a result of Fox affiliating with WAGA and KDFW (KDAF eventually launched a news department in January 1999; while WATL would not air news until September 2006, when it launched a 10:00 p.m. newscast produced by NBC affiliate WXIA-TV (channel 11), which became its sister station around that time after Tribune Broadcasting sold WATL to the Gannett Company).

By the time of Fox's buyout of the company in 1996, some of New World's stations were still underperforming. Observers cited "a reluctance of station managers to embrace the new network and a tendency to cling to conservative news and promotional styles." Indeed, many of the group's stations retained their Big Three-era branding schemes after affiliating with Fox (such as WDAF, which retained its universal Newschannel 4 branding; and KDFW, which continued to title its newscasts as News 4 Texas but otherwise used the moniker "Fox 4 Texas"), but received major image overhauls between 1996 and 1998 (such as WTVT and WAGA dropping their heritage Eyewitness News branding, and KSAZ dropping its "sunset 10" logo after nearly fifteen years). In contrast, KTBC, WITI, WJBK and KTVI discontinued their respective previous brand identities by the winter of late 1995, becoming the first New World stations to adopt those compliant with Fox's station branding conventions prior to Fox's acquisition of the group: KTBC replaced its "Channel 7" and NewsCenter 7 brands to identify as "Fox 7" (becoming likely the first New World station to fully comply with the network standardizations in October 1995); WJBK and KTVI respectively replaced their "TV-2"/Eyewitness News and "Channel 2"/2 News Team brands in favor of the "Fox 2" moniker (although WJBK retained the Eyewitness News title for its newscasts until October 1996), while WITI – branding similarly to WJW – identified as "Fox is Six" for general promotion and "Six is News" for newscasts from 1995 until 1997, when it rebranded as "Fox Six" (altered to the numerical "Fox 6" in 1998). In October 1995, WJW controversially dropped its longtime "TV8" and Newscenter 8 brands in favor of "Fox is ei8ht" for general purposes and ei8ht IS NEWS for its newscasts; both new brands were used fairly repetitiously in promotions, until WJW rebranded as "Fox 8" when Fox purchased the station.

Additionally, some of the new Fox affiliates, perhaps in appealing to Fox's younger-skewing audiences, moved many older news personalities to daytime broadcasts or released them entirely from their news staffs; one notable exception is Dick Goddard, who joined WJW as its lead meteorologist in 1966 and remained with the station, eventually working in a reduced capacity, as the weeknight meteorologist for its 10:00 p.m. newscast until his retirement after the November 2016 elections. Some of these personalities eventually wound up on other stations, such as the new Big Three affiliates.

To this day, New World's Fox affiliates saw mixed results with their newscasts:
 In Tampa, after it switched to Fox, WTVT lost its first-place position among the market's local television newscasts to WFLA-TV (channel 8), which was the only major network station in the market that was not affected by the switches, as it remained an NBC affiliate through an existing contract between the network and WFLA owner Media General.
 In Cleveland, WEWS (which shunned CBS via the ABC-Scripps deal) overtook WJW-TV as the market's top-rated news station. The problems with WJW's news coverage were especially evident following the Oklahoma City bombing on April 19, 1995, as it had to rely on external feeds from CNN Newsource since Fox did not have a news division (and would not until 1996). NBC station WKYC-TV, a longtime also-ran that for years (until the network sold a controlling stake in the station to Multimedia Inc. in 1990) had been used as a "farm team" outlet under NBC ownership to build up talent for its owned-and-operated sister stations in larger markets, began to post higher ratings for the first time in decades. WJW has since regained the ratings lead for most of its newscasts, while WEWS fell to third – and eventually, fourth – place behind WOIO, which originally had its newscasts produced by then-LMA partner and independent station-turned-primary WB/secondary UPN affiliate WUAB (channel 43, now an affiliate of The CW co-owned with WOIO through Raycom Media) – which had been producing a prime time newscast of its own since January 4, 1988 – when it joined CBS before reversing the arrangement between the two by 2002.
 In Austin, KTBC – which had long been the market's dominant news station (and the sole VHF station) – fell to the bottom of the ratings behind two of its UHF competitors, NBC affiliate KXAN-TV (channel 36) and ABC affiliate KVUE (channel 24), and in some time slots, even behind the station that replaced it as Austin's CBS affiliate, KEYE-TV.
 In Phoenix, NBC affiliate KPNX (channel 12) – the only VHF commercial station not affected by the complex four-station switch spurred by KSAZ-TV's move to Fox – rose from third to first place in the market, overtaking KTVK (which, after losing ABC to KNXV, affiliated with The WB before the network moved to its upstart then-LMA partner, KASW (channel 61), in September 1995 in an effort to ease issues with KTVK's newly expanded inventory of local news and syndicated programming) for the position.
 Some New World stations, however, have maintained their ratings dominance. In Birmingham, WBRC places first in most news timeslots (which has been the case historically due partly to its status as a VHF station in a market where the mountainous terrain within the area hampered reception of UHF stations), and its prime time newscast is considered to be one of the nation's highest-rated individual newscasts. After briefly falling to second behind ABC affiliate KMBC-TV (channel 9), whose reclamation of first place after WDAF's switch to Fox further intensified the rivalry between the two stations, WDAF in Kansas City has since finished at No. 1 in several timeslots, including in the morning and at 9:00 p.m. (in timeslots where the station does not have an absolute hold in that position, WDAF competes for second place with KCTV).
 Another key positive was also in regards to the expanded morning newscasts on the new Fox affiliates, most of which perform competitively and even place first in the ratings overall and/or in certain hours during the programs' duration (even overtaking one or more of the national morning news-talk programs aired by CBS, ABC and NBC in the 7:00 to 9:00 a.m. time period), in contrast to the constant flux and upheavals with CBS' morning shows.

Many of the new Big Three UHF affiliates found difficulty gaining an audience, and whether or not they were successful depended on their previous affiliations. As these were former Fox affiliates or independents that either did not have news departments or only offered a prime time newscast at the time they switched, almost all of them had to give in to launching new newscasts to back up the national news programs provided by the networks – replicating the previous news programming output of their new network's departing affiliate as part of the new affiliation deals in some cases, and carrying evening-only newscasts at the outset (with morning and, in many instances, midday newscasts being added at a later date) in others. Generally, the stations that continue to air newscasts to this day have generally finished in third or fourth place in overall viewership behind their VHF competitors. However, while many of these stations often finish near or at the bottom of their markets' local news ratings, some – such as KNXV, WFTS, KSHB and WOIO (in the latter's case after making a switch to tabloid journalism (which is similar to Sunbeam and Post-Newsweek owned stations have a same presentation in that period) in 2002 that garnered it national attention, eventually reverting to a traditional format in August 2015) – have experienced gradual ratings growth.

Furthermore, other new affiliates that launched newscasts failed to gain traction with their competitors and eventually either cancelled or outsourced their newscasts. In Evansville, WEVV-TV moved its 9:00 p.m. newscast to 10:00 p.m. (expanding it from five to seven days a week) and added newscasts at noon and 5:00 p.m. upon joining CBS on December 3, 1995. However, due to declining ratings, its news department was shut down in June 2001; months after the station was sold to Bayou City Broadcasting (by way of an aborted deal to sell the station to a shell corporation of the Nexstar Broadcasting Group), WEVV relaunched an in-house news department on August 3, 2015. In Detroit, WKBD began producing an 11:00 p.m. newscast for sister station WWJ-TV (in an arrangement identical to that between WOIO and WUAB) in April 2001, after the two formed a duopoly as a result of Viacom's 2000 merger with CBS. Despite being network-owned, prior to the launch of the program, WWJ-TV was the only station that became a Big Three outlet as a result of Fox's various affiliation deals that had not provided any news programming through a newly launched or existing news department. The WKBD and WWJ newscasts were canceled in December 2002 after WKBD entered into a news share agreement with WXYZ-TV to produce its 10:00 p.m. newscast, which was canceled in 2005. As a result, WWJ became the largest major-network station by market size, and the only O&O of any major network at the time, without newscasts of any kind. From 2006 to 2008, WWJ-TV made light of this fact in its slogan, "Where No News is Good News", used to promote programming during periods where there would usually be newscasts. On May 5, 2009, WWJ debuted First Forecast Mornings, a weekday morning newscast produced in association with the Detroit Free Press, which was cancelled on December 28, 2012, due to low ratings.

ABC affiliates KDNL-TV (channel 30) in St. Louis and WXLV-TV (channel 45) in Winston-Salem, North Carolina (which respectively replaced KTVI and WGHP (channel 8) as the ABC outlets for those markets as a result of Fox's agreement with then-KTVI owner New World and Fox Television Stations' purchase of WGHP due to FCC national ownership caps that forced New World to divest that station) also experienced difficulty with their newscasts. KDNL, which is currently one of ABC's weakest affiliates (perhaps the weakest among the 50 largest markets in sharp contrast to KTVI, which – although it ranked in third place locally for much of its tenure with the network – was one of ABC's strongest stations), shut down its news department on October 12, 2001, after six years, a move widely blamed on a sharp ratings decline resulting from a transmitter problem that caused the station to go dark for several days. From January 3, 2011, to January 31, 2014, NBC affiliate KSDK (channel 5) produced weeknight-only newscasts for KDNL through a news share agreement (the agreement also allowed KDNL to air weekend rebroadcasts of KSDK's tourism/lifestyle program Show Me St. Louis); afterward, KDNL began airing weather cut-ins during Good Morning America, which are now provided by Columbus, Ohio, sister station WSYX (channel 6). KDNL resumed news production on January 13, 2015, with the debate-driven news program The Allman Report, hosted by KFTK-FM radio host Jamie Allman; it was cancelled on April 9, 2018, after Allman made a controversial tweet regarding to activist and student, David Hogg. WXLV, which shut down its first news department on January 11, 2002, began producing an 11:00 p.m. newscast from 2004 to 2005 through owner Sinclair Broadcast Group's controversial News Central experiment; it was cancelled after Sinclair discontinued the local/national hybrid format due to poor ratings. In February 2012, News 14 Carolina (now Spectrum News North Carolina, which it adopted after Charter Communications completed its acquisition of Time Warner Cable on May 18, 2016) began producing daily newscasts for WXLV, as part of a retransmission consent dispute settlement between Time Warner Cable and Sinclair.

Fox Kids repercussions
Uncharacteristic for a major network affiliate, nearly all of the ten stations involved in the New World-Fox deal chose not to carry Fox's children's programming block, Fox Kids, due to an interest in airing more local news. In contrast, Big Three affiliates were required to air their network's children's programming, often airing them at the time around local weekend morning newscasts (though some stations have historically pre-empted some portion of the networks' children's blocks); however, ABC, NBC and CBS only aired their blocks on Saturday mornings, whereas Fox Kids aired Monday through Saturdays (consisting of a one-hour morning block and a two-hour afternoon block on weekdays, in addition to a four-hour Saturday morning lineup). Conversely, the SF Broadcasting stations and other new Fox affiliates from ancillary deals spurred by the New World agreement chose to carry Fox Kids.

Owing to it being acquired by the network outright, WGHP initially cleared Fox Kids upon its switch to Fox; but by the spring of 1996, Fox had decided to allow its owned-and-operated stations the option of dropping the block if another station in their local market was interested in airing it (as the New World stations had done). That March, Fox Kids moved to WB affiliate WBFX (channel 20, now CW affiliate WCWG). WBRC, which had also planned to air Fox Kids, likewise allowed former Fox affiliate WTTO (channel 21, now a CW affiliate) and its satellite WDBB (channel 17) to continue airing the block even after it became an independent station. These moves, along with WBRC remaining an ABC affiliate for its first six months under Fox ownership and the eventual acquisition of New World, made it the fourth network which had O&Os that did not air all network programming (as a CBS O&O, WCAU did not air CBS' Sunday morning cartoons during 1978; WPVI-TV (channel 6) in Philadelphia pre-empted an hour of ABC programming even after its owner Capital Cities Communications bought the network in 1986; and after its 1987 purchase of the station, NBC was forced to run WTVJ as a CBS affiliate until its contract with the latter network – as well as NBC's contract with its previous Miami affiliate WSVN (channel 7) – ended on December 31, 1988). WTTO dropped Fox Kids in September 2000, with the former WBFX (renamed WTWB-TV) following suit a year later.

In St. Louis, religious station KNLC (channel 24), owned by the New Life Christian Church, began airing Fox Kids in August 1995 in lieu of KTVI after KPLR-TV turned the block down; however, the church's reverend, Larry Rice, refused to show commercials during the block's program breaks, replacing them with ministry messages – some of which dealt with such controversial topics as abortion, same-sex marriage and the death penalty. Concerned about this, Fox moved the block to KTVI in September 1996, making it the only former New World station to air Fox Kids (KTVI later carried its successors FoxBox and 4Kids TV); however, the station aired the Saturday block two hours earlier than other stations, in order to air a morning newscast at 9:00 a.m. In Cleveland, WBNX-TV (channel 55) gained an extensive children's programming inventory when it acquired Fox Kids (in lieu of WJW) in September 1994, along with several syndicated children's programs dropped by WOIO (WBNX would later add the Kids' WB block in September 1997, when it assumed the WB affiliation from WUAB, which became an exclusive UPN affiliate). Even in markets without a New World/Fox-owned station, Fox affiliates began passing Fox Kids off to another local station, usually an independent station or minor network affiliate – such as in San Antonio, where 4KidsTV moved from KABB (channel 29) to WB-affiliated sister station KMYS (channel 35, now a CW affiliate) in September 2006, and Fresno, where KMPH-TV (channel 26) moved the block to its WB-affiliated sister KFRE-TV (channel 59, also now a CW affiliate) in September 2005.

Because of the various clearance shifts, Fox Kids/FoxBox/4Kids TV was merely a syndication package, even though Fox advertised in promos that aired during certain prime time shows (as well as in fall preview specials for the blocks that the affected stations were obligated to carry) that its children's programming was part of the network. Although New World stations in Atlanta, Austin, Cleveland, High Point and Phoenix had turned down the various iterations of Fox's children's program blocks (Fox Kids, FoxBox and 4Kids TV), none of them filled the Saturday morning timeslots with newscasts, carrying paid programming and local real estate presentation shows in their place; those stations, along with other Fox stations that did not air the blocks, also aired children's programs acquired via syndication – eventually incorporating series (such as Safari Tracks and Beakman's World) that meet FCC rules requiring stations to air three hours of educational and informative children's programs each week (unlike most seen on 4Kids TV) – either following a newscast or in place of it (as part of its Major League Baseball coverage, Fox aired This Week in Baseball to count towards a half-hour of E/I programming across the network, which was replaced in 2013 by the short-lived MLB Player Poll). In Atlanta, Austin, Birmingham and the Piedmont Triad, 4Kids TV was not carried in those markets after stations that had held the local rights dropped the lineup.

Owing to the preemptions and other factors (such as a pay dispute with 4Kids Entertainment, and the shift of Saturday morning children's audiences to cable television and video on demand services), 4Kids TV ended on December 27, 2008. Fox gave two of the block's four hours back to its stations, while the remaining two hours were retained to program a paid programming block under the branding Weekend Marketplace. Many of the stations which took 4KidsTV in lieu of the local Fox stations (such as WMLW-CA (channel 41) in Milwaukee) chose not to take Weekend Marketplace, along with those Fox stations; as a result, the block saw limited clearance outside of O&Os and Fox stations which previously cleared 4Kids TV. On September 13, 2014, Fox debuted Xploration Station, a two-hour syndicated block of live-action programs from Steve Rotfeld Productions that focus on the STEM fields. The block, which is designed to fulfill the FCC's educational programming requirements (stations carrying the block continue to air syndicated E/I-compliant programs to meet the entire three-hour quota), is primarily carried on Fox stations owned by Fox Television Stations and Tribune Broadcasting (including those that declined to carry Fox's earlier children's programming efforts and Weekend Marketplace); however like Weekend Marketplace and Fox's predecessor children's program blocks, the block is carried on a CW or MyNetworkTV affiliate, or an independent station in most markets. Sinclair has since attempted to relaunch a daily children's block through their smaller stations, KidsClick, which aired from July 1, 2017, to March 31, 2019, and also was carried by all affiliates of the digital subchannel network This TV and TBD.

Canadian repercussions
Until the affiliation switches, subscription television providers in Canada could carry three American commercial networks and those three only if they also committed to carry a PBS member station (per an obscure rule dating to the late 1970s, referred to by the Canadian Radio-television and Telecommunications Commission at the time as the "3+1 rule"), with exceptions made to allow additional stations receivable over-the-air in certain areas (as a result, some towns in British Columbia received Fox programming via KAYU-TV (channel 28) in Spokane, Washington, and the Windsor–Essex County region in Ontario received nearly the entire lineup of Detroit stations on cable and over-the-air, while towns in Alberta were denied such importation of signals). The CRTC had stated in June 1994 – a few weeks after New World agreed to affiliate most of its stations with Fox – that it was not willing to modify this rule, but due to pressure from both citizens and cable operators, by September, it allowed Canadian cable providers to pick up a station affiliated with Fox without having to bump one affiliated with a Big Three network for it; the "3+1" rule effectively became the "4+1" rule as a result.

Additional changes were in store for Canadian cable providers that carried the major network affiliates based out of Detroit; while they were able to continue carrying WJBK when it switched to Fox because of the new rules, they also had to add a CBS station, often from its new Detroit O&O WWJ-TV; providers in Southwestern Ontario had issues receiving the UHF signal of the network's new Cleveland affiliate, WOIO.

See also
 1994 in American television
 2006 United States broadcast television realignment – the next major affiliation shuffle in America, involving the shutdowns of UPN and The WB and the subsequent launches of The CW and MyNetworkTV
 2001 Vancouver TV realignment – a similar event that occurred in Canada involving five television stations in southern British Columbia

References

History of television in the United States
Fox Broadcasting Company

E. W. Scripps Company
American Broadcasting Company
Westinghouse Broadcasting
CBS Television Network
National Broadcasting Company

1994 in American television
1995 in American television
1996 in American television
1997 in American television
1994 in economics
News Corporation